Diplazium sibiricum, otherwise known as the Mole-Ladder is a species of fern. It is found in Siberia, across Russia, in Finland, and in northern Asia. They can be found on elevations between 30m-3000m.

References

Diplazium sibiricum Hardy Fern Library
Diplazium sibiricum (Turcz. ex Kunze) Sa.Kurata  Korean Plant Names Index

sibiricum
Ferns of Asia
Ferns of Europe
Flora of Siberia
Flora of Finland
Flora of Korea
Flora of Russia
Flora of Northeast Asia
Plants described in 1961